Albert Brown may refer to:

Politicians
 Albert A. Brown (1895–1971), Canadian politician, lawyer and football player
 Albert G. Brown (1813–1880), Governor of Mississippi and U.S. Senator
 Albert Joseph Brown (1861–1938), Canadian lawyer and politician
 Albert O. Brown (1852–1937), American lawyer, banker and Republican politician from New Hampshire

Sportspeople
 Albert Brown (footballer, born 1862) (1862–1930), English footballer and top scorer for Aston Villa in the 1890–1891 season
 Albert Brown (footballer, born 1879) (1879–1955), English footballer, The Tamworth Sprinter
 Albert Brown (Australian cricketer) (1890–1954), Australian cricketer
 Albert Brown (snooker player) (1911–1995), English cricketer and snooker player
 Albert Brown (Canadian football) (born 1963), Canadian football player
 Albert Kedrick Brown (born 1981), American basketball player

Others
 Albert Greenwood Brown (born 1954), American convict sentenced to death in San Quentin, California
 Albert Joseph Brown III (born 1968), American performer known as Al B. Sure!
 Albert Brown (American veteran) (1905–2011), survivor of the Bataan Death March
 Albert Oldfield Brown (1872–1945), American actor 
 Albert E. Brown (1889–1984), United States Army general
 USS Albert Brown (SP-1050) (1875–1920), tug boat commissioned by the U.S. Navy during World War I

See also
 Bert Brown (disambiguation)
 Al Brown (disambiguation)